Wilberforce is a small town in New South Wales, Australia, in the local government area of the City of Hawkesbury. It is just beyond the outer suburbs of north-west Sydney and lies on the western bank of the Hawkesbury River.

History
Wilberforce is one of the original settlements established as a township by Lachlan Macquarie, colonial governor of New South Wales 1810–21. It is known locally as "Macquarie Town", a title given to townships established by Governor Macquarie on 6 December 1810 in and around the Sydney metropolitan area.
It was named after William Wilberforce (1759–1833), who was a British politician, philanthropist, and a leader of the movement to abolish the slave trade.

Heritage listings 
Wilberforce has a number of heritage-listed sites, including:
 Clergy Road: Wilberforce Cemetery
 47 George Road: Wilberforce Park
 43-43a Macquarie Road: St John's Anglican Church and Macquarie Schoolhouse
 Rose Street: Australiana Pioneer Village
 Rose Street: Rose Cottage
 Stannix Park Road: Stannix Park House

Key sites and points of interest

Macquarie Schoolhouse (1819) and St John's Church (1859)

The historic St John's Anglican Church was designed by Edmund Thomas Blacket and built by J. Atkinson of Windsor. Construction was started in 1856 and the building was not completed until 1859 at a cost of £1500. The grounds of the church and contains the Old School House building (Built 1819), which was used as a school, a church, and a residence of the school master until the church was completed. The school house was replaced in 1880 by a Public School. The original church building is still used for the church's 8 am service with the modern education centre used for later services.

Howorth Grave (1804, relocated 1960)
Relocated to a position in front of the schoolhouse, the grave marks the death of a child bitten by a snake on a nearby property. Grave moved on 5 December 1960 by the Hawkesbury Historical Society.

 
Wilberforce Park (1810) 

This is the original town square proclaimed by Macquarie, and still retains its original relationship with the schoolhouse, cemetery and townships. In the park itself is the War Memorial, erected by local residents in 1918. In 1966, it was relocated within the park, and new plaques were added at this time.

Australiana Pioneer Village 

Opened around 1970, the village contains a number of buildings from the surrounding area which were physically transported to the site. Among them is 'Rose Cottage'; the oldest timber slab cottage in Australia standing on its original site.

Wilberforce Cemetery (1815 onwards) 

This cemetery sits on Old Sackville Road, near the intersection with Singleton Road (Putty Road). There are a number of graves of the area's pioneers; notably the somewhat unusual Table Slab Grave.

Notable residents
Wilberforce is the birthplace of bushranger Captain Thunderbolt.

References

 
Suburbs of Sydney
City of Hawkesbury
1810 establishments in Australia
Hawkesbury River